Wilton-Fijenoord was a shipbuilding and repair company in Schiedam the Netherlands from 1929 to 1999. Presently, the shipyard of Wilton-Feijnoord is part of Damen Shiprepair Rotterdam.

Merger of Wilton and Fijenoord (1929) 
Wilton-Fijenoord had two predecessors. Wilton's Dok- en Werf Maatschappij was the biggest predecessor of Wilton-Fijenoord, the other was the Shipyard Fijenoord. By the mid 1920s these shipyards had become rather similar. Wilton still had an advantage in ship repair, and Fijenoord was still ahead in ship construction, especially for the navy. The idea for a merger dated as far back as at least 1927. The rationale was that the still profitable Wilton company had a major overcapacity and was spread over two locations. The activities of Fijenoord could just as well be done in Schiedam. A concentration of the combined activities in Schiedam would lead to major cost savings. In 1929 talks led to an agreement for a financial merger between the companies. Shares in Wilton and shares in Fijenoord were exchanged for shares in a new united company: Dok- en Werf-Maatschappij Wilton-Fijenoord. The ratio between worth of Wilton and Fijenoord was 15.5 : 3.

A new board of directors was formed by combining the board of directors of Wilton with that of Fijenoord. It had seven members, of which three from the Wilton family. The merger had taken place by creating a new public company that got all the shares of the existing companies. This was a fast way to merge, but it also meant that the organisations themselves continued to exist from a legal as well as an organizational perspective. These had a rather different culture. Many Wilton employees thought the Fijenoord men to be too precise and arrogant. Fijenoord employees tended to look at the Wilton men as disorganized, improvising and rude.

The Great Depression  
The Great Depression that started in November 1929 came at a very bad moment for Wilton-Fijenoord. Economic activity came to an almost complete standstill with regard to orders for new ships. Massive lay-offs reduced the number of employees at the company from 7,790 at the end of 1929 to 3,849 at the end of 1930, a decrease of 50%. In this crisis Wilton-Fijenoord faced a difficult decision. Should it radically concentrate all activity in Schiedam, and hope that the high cost for the move would be earned back by cost-savings? Or, should it evade the cost of the move by continuing at multiple locations? In 1932 the board decided to close down the Fijenoord location, and to move the activities on the Westkousdijk (Delfshaven) to Schiedam as much as possible. In the end this ambition to centralize everything in Schiedam would not be realized (cf. below).

Meanwhile, the crisis grew ever darker. Dividend payments were stopped, reserves were shrinking, and even the payment of interest became doubtful. The costs of the move to Schiedam also proved higher than estimated. Of course cost cutting was somewhat effective, but it was not enough. In 1932 the order for the cruiser  gave some air to the company. A few repair orders were also profitable. In 1935 the three floating dock were towed to Schiedam. Nevertheless, in 1935 the repair orders hit an absolute low, with 301 ships for 1,622,960 rtb.

On 29 January 1936 the board then proposed to postpone the repayment of part of open bonds by one year. The department of defense intervened by giving advance payments on submarine mine layers. In the end a government guarantee of a private loan of 1,500,000 guilders saved the company. A financial reorganization followed in 1936. The nominal capital of 25,000,000 guilders, which had been reduced to 15,500,000 guilders earlier, was further reduced to 4,650,000 guilders. Two old loans were repaid. It allowed the company to raise new capital of 3,900,000 in 1938. By 1938 the ship repair business had recovered. In 1928 the number of ships using the dry docks was 486 for a tonnage 2,506,609 R.T.B. In 1938 it were 463 ships with 2,590,696 R.T.B.  In 1938 and 1939 the shipyard paid dividend again.

Tankers 
The construction of tankers was the only kind of civilian construction that kept the large Dutch shipyards afloat. In November 1933 the Anglo-Saxon Petroleum company (part of Royal Dutch Shell) placed an order for three tankers of 12,000 tons capacity. One at NSM, one at RDM and one at Wilton-Fijenoord. The tanker at Wilton got the name Rapana. In the whole year 1934, Wilton-Fijenoord did not receive any order for a new ship. At the end of 1934 the work on Rapana was the only work on new merchant ships still ongoing.
In early 1935 the Bataafse Petroleum Maatschappij, another subsidiary of Shell, ordered six tankers for 6,000,000 guilders. The NSM would build the two largest of 12,100 tons. Wilton-Fijenoord would build two of the four ships of 9,250-ton capacity each. The order came in on 5 February 1935 and would permit Wilton to keep her slipways reasonably filled. In late 1935 Wilton-Fijenoord got another order for a 9,100 ton tanker. On 18 January 1936 Eulota of 9,100 tons was launched. On 25 April 1936 Elusa was launched. On 7 November 1936 the third 9,100-ton capacity ship Eulima was launched. In early November 1936 Wilton-Fijenoord got a new order for one tanker of 12,000 tons and one tanker of 9,000 tons.

The Nederlandsche Pacific Petroleum Maatschappij was active in the Dutch East Indies. It was a subsidiary of Standard Oil Company of California, later (Chevron Corporation). In May 1936 it ordered a 12,000-ton tanker at Wilton-Fijenoord. In June 1936 the Nederlandsche Pacific Petroleum Maatschappij then signed a contract for oil exploration in a big area of southern Sumatra. On 6 March 1937 the tanker called Nederland was launched.

Warships 

The order for two s, laid down in June 1931 was very welcome, but could not save the company. As stated above the order for the light cruiser De Ruyter was a more substantial 'aid'. The two mine-laying s were laid down in June 1936. At that moment the worst of the crisis was over, but the liquidity was saved by the above-mentioned advance payments on these ships. The  that was later named De Ruyter was laid down in September 1939, too late to be launched before the Netherlands were occupied in 1940.

Cooperation in design 
A notorious problem for the Dutch yards before the Second World War, was the lack of design capabilities. Accordingly, Wilton-Fijenoord had to buy the vessel designs from independent design companies and developed only the detailed structures. By a cartel agreement, four Dutch yards including Wilton-Fijenoord formed a joint design office in 1935. As a contractor, the yard contributed mainly its expertise in organizing the construction of ships.

Another cooperation in design was that between Fijenoord and the IVS or NV Ingenieurskantoor voor Scheepsbouw. The IVS was deeply involved in the design of De Ruyter, and so the similarity in appearance between the s and De Ruyter is explained.

World War II 
During World War II Wilton-Fijenoord completed the submarine O 25. During the war Fijenoord would also launch the cruiser later named De Ruyter, but known at that moment as KH 1 (Kreuzer Holland 1). The dry docks of the company were severely bombarded by the allies, and were almost broken up by the Germans. Next the machinery of the factory was plundered, especially late in the war.

Post World War II

Back in business 
After the war the company faced many issues. The board of directors was accused of collaboration, and the yard itself was a ruin. The company was lucky that the old bank slope of predecessor Wilton at the Westkousdijk, and the iron foundry of predecessor Fijenoord at Feijenoord were still usable, instead of having been closed down as intended in the operation to concentrate the company at Schiedam. In spite of these challenges the yard started on its first repair order already on 19 June 1945. For this it could only use the fixed building dock, because both drydocks were broken.

In October 1945 Annenkerk, ordered before the war, was laid down. Westerdam, which had been laid down before the war was also finished. The cruiser De Ruyter would also be finished, but her plan had to be changed drastically because of the experience gained in the war. In 1946 new ships were ordered. One by the Rotterdamsche Lloyd, and two by KPM. Repair orders also increased in 1946. In March 1946 a license agreement was signed with William Doxford & Sons to produce Doxford Diesel engines.

Back to normal productivity 
After some activity had returned in 1946, the shipyard was still not at a normal level of activity. The 20,000 tons dock was fixed in 1947, and in that year 166 ships were repaired in the drydocks, double the amount of the previous year. Meanwhile, the shipyard had to catch up with the advanced welding techniques that had revolutionized British and American shipbuilding. On the Westkousdijk a gun factory had been created before the war. In cooperation with Bofors it now started the construction of armored double 15 cm turrets for the two De Zeven Provinciën-class cruisers, as well as armored 12 cm turrets for destroyers. The former Fijenoord terrain started a second youth when the foundry was modernized and a new model office was started. In Schiedam a testbed was realized just in time to test the first Doxford engines in 1949. On 11 April 1950 the 46,000 tons drydock had been repaired and was taken into use again. In 1952 the tonnage of ships repaired matched that of 1938.

The 1950s 

The construction of Rijndam (1951) and Maasdam (1952) probably signaled the full recovery of the company. The Korean War would give rise to an increased demand for ships, especially tankers. In the summer of 1952 the construction of the big fixed building dock started. It was to be 211 m long and 31.5 m wide. The machine factory was expanded, and so were the facilities on the Westkousdijk. The company became the chief contractor for 32 minesweepers, of which it would build three.  The 1954 jubilee was celebrated with confidence.

End of Wilton-Fijenoord as an independent company 

In 1999, Wilton-Fijenoord was integrated into Rotterdam United Shipyards. In 2003, the company was acquired by Damen Group.

Ships built
 Passenger liners:
 Fairstar, launched in 1964 for Sitmar Line
 Maasdam, launched in 1952 for Holland America Line
 Statendam, launched in 1956 for Holland America Line
 Whaling factory:
 Willem Barendsz (II), launched in 1955
 Tankships:
 J.B. Aug. Kessler, launched in 1902 and 29 others built for Shell Royal Dutch
 Rapana, for Anglo-Saxon Petroleum 
 Eulota, launched in 1936 for Bataafsche Petroleum Maatschappij
 Elusa, launched in 1936 for Bataafsche Petroleum Maatschappij
 Eulima, launched in 1936 for Bataafsche Petroleum Maatschappij
 Nederland, launched in 1937 for Nederlandsche Pacific Petroleum Maatschappij (Standard Oil of California)
 Poitou, launched in 1954 for Société Française de Transports Pétroliers 
 Cargo/passenger ships:
 Camphuys, launched in 1949 for Koninklijke Java China Paketvaart Lijnen

Warships
Cruisers
 , a unique cruiser launched in 1935
 HNLMS De Ruyter, a  launched in 1944

Destroyers
 German destroyer T61, a Flottentorpedoboot 1940 destroyer
 , a 
 , a 

Submarines
 , an 
 , an O 19-class submarine
 , an 
 , a Potvis-class submarine
 , a Potvis-class submarine
 Hai Lung, ROC Navy
 Hai Hu, ROC Navy
Frigates
 , a 
 , a Kortenaer-class frigate
 , a Fatahillah-class frigate for the Indonesian Navy
 , a Fatahillah-class frigate for the Indonesian Navy
 , a Fatahillah-class frigate for the Indonesian Navy
 Elli (F450) and Limnos (F451) – frigates for the Greek Navy

Minesweepers
 HNLMS Dokkum, a Dokkum-class minesweeper
 HNLMS Overijssel, a Dokkum-class minesweeper
 HNLMS Roermond, a Dokkum-class minesweeper

Notes

References

External links
 

Wilton-Fijenoord
Defunct companies of the Netherlands
Shipbuilding companies of the Netherlands
Companies based in South Holland
History of Schiedam
Defence companies of the Netherlands